An acyanotic heart defect,  is a class of congenital heart defects.  In these, blood is shunted (flows) from the left side of the heart to the right side of the heart, most often due to a structural defect (hole) in the interventricular septum.  People often retain normal levels of oxyhemoglobin saturation in systemic circulation.

This term is outdated, because a person with an acyanotic heart defect may show cyanosis (turn blue due to insufficient oxygen in the blood).

Signs and symptoms 
Presentation is the following:
 Shortness of breath
 Congested cough
 Diaphoresis
 Fatigue
 Frequent respiratory infections
 Machine-like heart murmur
 Tachycardia
 Tachypnea
 Respiratory distress
 Mild cyanosis (in right sided heart failure)
 Poor growth and development (from increased energy spent on breathing)

Complications 
This condition can cause congestive heart failure.

Diagnosis

Types 
Left to right shunting heart defects include:
 Ventricular septal defect (VSD) (30% of all congenital heart defects)
 Atrial septal defect (ASD)
 Atrioventricular septal defect (AVSD)
 Patent ductus arteriosus (PDA)

Others:
 levo-Transposition of the great arteries (l-TGA),

Acyanotic heart defects without shunting include:
 Pulmonary stenosis (a narrowing of the pulmonary valve)
 Aortic stenosis
 Coarctation of the aorta

Management 
Treatment of this condition can be done via:
 Medications: Digoxin/Lanoxin
 Diuretics: Furosemide/Lasix
 Surgery

See also
 Cyanotic heart defect

References

 NCLEX-PN Review 2nd Ed. (2006). Lippincott Williams & Wilkins. .

Congenital heart defects